Luca Aerni (born 27 March 1993) is a Swiss World Cup alpine ski racer. Born in Châtel-Saint-Denis, he competed for Switzerland at three Winter Olympics and three World Championships.

At the World Championships in 2017 on home snow in St. Moritz, Aerni won the gold medal in the combined event.

World Cup results

Season standings

Race podiums
0 wins
1 podium (1 SL); 20 top tens

World Championship results

Olympic results

References

External links

 
 
 
 Swiss Ski team – official site – 
 

1993 births
Living people
Olympic alpine skiers of Switzerland
Alpine skiers at the 2014 Winter Olympics
Alpine skiers at the 2018 Winter Olympics
Alpine skiers at the 2022 Winter Olympics
Swiss male alpine skiers
People from Sierre District
Medalists at the 2018 Winter Olympics
Olympic medalists in alpine skiing
Olympic gold medalists for Switzerland
Sportspeople from Valais
21st-century Swiss people